Days of the White Owl is the first full-length album from Californian hardcore punk band, The Nerve Agents. It was released in July, 2000 on Revelation Records and it follows their self-titled EP from 1998.

Overview 
As with their debut EP, the emphasis is on classic style hardcore punk, played at a fast pace – the songs are rarely over 2.5 minutes long.

Piano pieces at the beginning and end – played and written by bass player, Dante Sigona – are in stark contrast to the music contained within. A lot of the songs rely on bass as well as guitar riffs to carry the melody on to its swift conclusion.

The band received some criticism for this album for the lack of originality – but by and large it was well received by hardcore punk fans, with its catchy tunes and breakneck pace.

Track listing 
All tracks written by The Nerve Agents, unless otherwise stated

Personnel 
 Eric "Sheric D" – vocals
 Zac "The Butcher" Hunter – guitar
 Tim "Timmy Stardust" Presley – guitar
 Dante Sigona – bass, piano
 Andy "Outbreak" Granelli – drums
 Davey Havok – additional vocals on "Jekyl And Hyde"
 Dixie Death – additional vocals on "Evil"
 Recorded, mixed and mastered in November, 2000 at the Art of Ears, Hayward, California, USA
 Produced by Andy Ernst and The Nerve Agents

See also 
 Redemption 87's album, All Guns Poolside – Eric Ozenne's previous band

References

External links 
Epitaph / Hellcat Records band page
Revelation Records' Days Of The White Owl page 

2000 debut albums
The Nerve Agents albums